Taisiya Laptyeva is a Soviet sprint canoer who competed in the late 1970s. She won a bronze medal in the K-4 500 m event at the 1977 ICF Canoe Sprint World Championships in Sofia.

References

Living people
Soviet female canoeists
Year of birth missing (living people)
ICF Canoe Sprint World Championships medalists in kayak